Dinocardium is a genus of large saltwater clams or cockles, marine bivalve molluscs in the family Cardiidae, the cockles. There is only one species in the genus, Dinocardium robustum, or the Atlantic giant cockle.

Description
Dinocardium robustum has a shell that reaches a length of 100–125 mm. This large and sturdy shell is obliquely ovate, with crenulate margins and about 32-36 rounded radial ribs present on both the inside and the outside. The valves are symmetrical with one another (equivalve). The basic color of the surface usually is creamy white, mottled with reddish-brown markings, while the interior is pinkish. This cockle burrows into the substrate by means of its strong foot, and like most bivalves feeds by filtering the water for plankton.

<div align=center>

</div align=center>

<div align=center>

</div align=center>

Distribution
This species can be found along the western Atlantic coast of North America, in the Gulf of Mexico and in the Caribbean Sea.

References
 Biolib
 WoRMS

External links
 

Cardiidae
Bivalve genera
Monotypic mollusc genera